USS Bennion (DD-662) was a Fletcher-class destroyer of the United States Navy. Captain Bennion was posthumously awarded the Medal of Honor.

Bennion was launched 4 July 1943 by Boston Navy Yard, sponsored by Captain Bennion's widow. It was commissioned 14 December 1943.

Service history
Other US destroyers joined in the short fight, and both Japanese destroyers turned away, only for Momi to be caught, torpedoed and sunk by TBM Avengers of Task Force 77 shortly afterwards.

Bennion departed Philadelphia, Pa. 3 March 1944 escorting the light aircraft carrier  to the Pacific. Arriving at Pearl Harbor 22 March, she trained and patrolled in Hawaiian waters until 29 May 1944. Moving westward she served as a fighter director and radar picket ship during the following campaigns:
 Marianas Operation (10 June 1944 – 27 August 1944)
 Tinian Capture and Occupation (24 July 1944 – 1 August 1944)
 Western Caroline Islands Operation (31 August – 14 October 1944)
 Leyte Operation (10 October 1944 – 29 November 1944)
 Luzon Operation (12 December 1944 – 1 April 1945)
 Iwo Jima Operation (15 February 1945 – 16 March 1945)
 Okinawa Gunto Operation (Task Force 54, 17 March 1945 – 30 June 1945)
 Third Fleet Operations Against Japan (10 July 1945 – 15 August 1945)

During the Battle of Surigao Strait, in October 1944, Bennion assisted in sinking the Japanese battleship Yamashiro with torpedoes. Future Chief of Naval Operations Lieutenant (junior grade) James L. Holloway III, served on the Bennion as officer in charge of the destroyer's main fire director. The full extent of Bennion'''s contribution to sinking the Yamashiro was not recognized until 2010.Bennion returned to Puget Sound Navy Yard 27 October 1945 and went out of commission in reserve at Long Beach, Calif., 20 June 1946. The ship was stricken from the Naval Vessel Register 15 April 1971. She was sold 30 May 1973 and broken up for scrap.

AwardsBennion'' received the Presidential Unit Citation for her actions off Okinawa (1 April – 1 June 1945), and eight battle stars.

References

External links

navsource.org: USS Bennion
hazegray.org: USS Bennion
Veterans Newsletter

World War II destroyers of the United States
Ships built in Boston
1943 ships
Fletcher-class destroyers of the United States Navy